The 1946 Colgate Red Raiders football team was an American football team that represented Colgate University as an independent during the 1946 college football season. In its 18th and final season under head coach Andrew Kerr, the team compiled a 4–4 record and outscored opponents by a total of 154 to 95. Robert Orlando was the team captain. The team played its home games at Colgate Athletic Field in Hamilton, New York.

In Kerr's final game as Colgate's head coach, the team trailed 7–0 to Brown at halftime. Kerr gave a speech asking his team to score three touchdowns in the second half. The team complied and sent Kerr out as a winner.

Schedule

After the season

The 1947 NFL Draft was held on December 16, 1946. The following Red Raiders were selected.

References

Colgate
Colgate Raiders football seasons
Colgate Red Raiders football